Bodil Holst is a Danish-Norwegian physicist known for her work on nanoscale imaging, material characterisation and mask based lithography using molecular beams. Other research areas include smart surfaces  and plant fibre identification.  She is a professor in the department of physics and technology at the University of Bergen in Norway.

Education and career
Holst studied physics and mathematics at the University of Copenhagen. In 1997, she earned a doctorate at the University of Cambridge.  She continued as a postdoctoral researcher at the Max Planck Institute for Fluid Dynamics in Göttingen, Germany and at the Graz University of Technology in Austria. On the verge of giving up her academic career, she came to the University of Bergen in 2007, funded by a recruitment grant from the Trond Mohn Foundation.

Books
Bodil Holst is the author of the self-published book Scientific Paper Writing: A Survival Guide (2015), illustrated by Jorge Cham. With Gianangelo Bracco, she is the co-editor of the book Surface Science Techniques (Springer, 2013).

Recognition
2019 Appointed Chair of the Kavli Prize Committee in Nanoscience for the period 2019-2024.  
2018 Elected to the Norwegian Academy of Technological Sciences
2015 Elected to the Royal Norwegian Society of Sciences and Letters
2007 Trond Mohn Research Foundation Recruitment Grant
2000 Alexander von Humboldt Foundation Fellowship
1999 Marie Skłodowska-Curie Actions Research Fellowship

References

External links

Year of birth missing (living people)
Living people
Danish physicists
Danish women physicists
Norwegian physicists
Norwegian women scientists
Academic staff of the University of Bergen
Alumni of the University of Cambridge
Members of the Norwegian Academy of Technological Sciences
Royal Norwegian Society of Sciences and Letters